Mordellistena aliena is a species of beetle in the genus Mordellistena of the family Mordellidae. It was discovered in 1967.

References

aliena
Beetles described in 1967